Syrian Revolution may refer to:

 Alawite revolt of 1919
 Hananu Revolt, 1920–1921
 Great Syrian Revolt, 1925–1927
 1963 Syrian coup d'état
 1966 Syrian coup d'état
 Corrective Movement (Syria), 1970
 2011 Syrian Revolution

See also
 Syrian War (disambiguation)